These are things named after Élie Cartan (9 April 1869 – 6 May 1951), a French mathematician.

Mathematics and physics

 Cartan calculus
 Cartan connection, Cartan connection applications
 Cartan's criterion
 Cartan decomposition
 Cartan's equivalence method
 Cartan formalism (physics)
 Cartan involution
 Cartan's magic formula
 Cartan relations
Cartan map
 Cartan matrix
 Cartan pair

 Cartan subalgebra
 Cartan subgroup
 Cartan's method of moving frames
 Cartan's theorem, a name for the closed-subgroup theorem
 Cartan's theorem, a name for the theorem on highest weights
 Cartan's theorem, a name for Lie's third theorem
 Einstein–Cartan theory
Einstein–Cartan–Evans theory
 Cartan–Ambrose–Hicks theorem
 Cartan–Brauer–Hua theorem
 Cartan–Dieudonné theorem
 Cartan–Hadamard manifold
 Cartan–Hadamard theorem
 Cartan–Iwahori decomposition
 Cartan-Iwasawa-Malcev theorem
 Cartan–Kähler theorem
 Cartan–Karlhede algorithm
 Cartan–Weyl theory
Cartan–Weyl basis
 Cartan–Killing form
 Cartan–Kuranishi prolongation theorem
 CAT(k) space
 Maurer–Cartan form
 Newton–Cartan theory
 Stokes–Cartan's theorem, the generalized fundamental theorem of calculus, proven by Cartan (in its general form), also known as Stokes' theorem although Stokes neither formulated nor proved it.

Other
Cartan (crater)
Élie Cartan Prize

Note some are after Henri Cartan, a son of É. Cartan; e.g.,
 Cartan's lemma (potential theory)
 Cartan seminar
 Cartan's theorems A and B
 Cartan–Eilenberg resolution

Cartan